An ecosystem is considered collapsed when its unique biotic (characteristic biota) or abiotic features are lost from all previous occurrences.  Ecosystem collapse causes ecological collapse within a system; essentially altering its stability, resilience, and diversity levels. It is, however, possible to reverse through careful restoration, and is thus not completely equivalent to species extinction. It occurs after a system has reached a so-called ecological 'tipping point', or crossed a critical threshold, and can no longer adequately respond to rapid changes in ecological conditions; either due to the suddenness or the scale of the changes.

It is important to note that—while certain types of accelerated ecosystem collapse or mass ecosystem collapse are typically viewed in a negative light—rapid environmental change and collapse have always been an integral part of the evolution and dynamics of the biosphere and marine ecosystems throughout geologic time. These processes historically contribute to ecosystem diversity by creating new types, or maintain and strengthen resilient systems while destroying non-resilient ones.

Drivers 
While collapse events can occur naturally with disturbances to an ecosystem—through fires, landslides, flooding, severe weather events, disease, or species invasion—there has been a noticeable increase in human-caused disturbances over the past fifty years. The combination of environmental change and the presence of human activity is increasingly detrimental to ecosystems of all types, as our unrestricted actions often increase the risk of abrupt (and potentially irreversible) changes post-disturbance; when a system would otherwise have been able to recover. Some behaviors that induce transformation are: human intervention in the balance of local diversity (through introduction of new species or overexploitation), alterations in the chemical balance of environments through pollution, modifications of local climate or weather with anthropogenic climate change, and habitat destruction or fragmentation in terrestrial/marine systems.

Despite the strong empirical evidence and highly visible collapse-inducing disturbances, anticipating collapse is a complex problem. The collapse can happen when the ecosystem's distribution decreases below a minimal sustainable size, or when key biotic processes and features disappear due to environmental degradation or disruption of biotic interactions. These different pathways to collapse can be used as criteria for estimating the risk of ecosystem collapse. Although states of ecosystem collapse are often defined quantitatively, few studies adequately describe transitions from pristine or original state towards collapse.

Examples of collapsed ecosystems 
The Rapa Nui subtropical broadleaf forests in Easter Island, formerly dominated by an endemic Palm, are considered collapsed due to the combined effects of overexplotaition, climate change and introduced exotic rats.

The Aral Sea was an endorheic lake between Kazakhstan and Uzbekistan. It was once considered one of the largest lakes in the world but has been shrinking since the 1960s after the rivers that fed it were diverted for large scale irrigation. By 1997, it had declined to 10% of its original size, splitting into much smaller hypersaline lakes, while dried areas have transformed into desert steppes.

The regime shift in the northern Benguela upwelling ecosystem is considered an example of ecosystem collapse in open marine environments. Prior to the 1970s sardines were the dominant vertebrate consumers, but overfishing and two adverse climatic events (Benguela Niño in 1974 and 1984)  lead to an impoverished ecosystem state with high biomass of jellyfish and pelagic goby.

Observational and geological record of cascaded regime-shifts 

An array of empirical evidence supports the existence of tipping points in the Earth system that, once triggered, would possibly irreversibly cascade to catalyze a shift (or "collapse") towards another ecosystem state or climate equilibrium. For example, a study found that geological records of the Paleocene–Eocene Thermal Maximum 55 million years ago show that substantial climate-shifting tipping points in the Earth system exist, which "can trigger release of additional carbon reservoirs and drive Earth's climate into a hotter state".

Effects 
Ecosystem collapse can lead to catastrophic declines of carrying capacity and mass extinction, and can also pose existential risk to human populations. They provide recourses that are essential for life—air, water, food, shelter, and energy— and so their health inherently impacts the Earth’s habitability. Many of the major negative ecological changes of the last few decades can be contributed to this deterioration of the world’s ecosystems. For example, increases in atmospheric greenhouse gas concentrations, widespread deforestation, massive biodiversity loss worldwide, and the decline of marine ecosystems are all influenced by declines in global ecosystems and directly effect human life.

Risk of collapse 

There are two tools commonly used together to assess risks to ecosystems and biodiversity: generic risk assessment protocols and stochastic simulation models. The most notable of the two tactics is risk assessment protocol, particularly because of the IUCN Red List of Ecosystems (RLE), which is widely applicable to many ecosystems even in data-poor circumstances. However, because using this tool is essentially comparing systems to a list of criteria, it is often limited in its ability to look at ecosystem decline holistically; and is thus often used in conjunction with simulation models that consider more aspects of decline such as ecosystem dynamics, future threats, and social-ecological relationships.

The IUCN RLE is a global standard that was developed to assess threats to various ecosystems on local, regional, national, and global scales, as well as to prompt conservation efforts in the face of the unparalleled decline of natural systems in the last decade. And though this effort is still in the earlier stages of implementation, the IUCN has a goal to assess the risk of collapse for all of the world’s ecosystems by 2025. The concept of ecosystem collapse is used in the framework to establish categories of risk for ecosystems, with the category Collapsed used as the end-point of risk assessment. Other categories of threat (Vulnerable, Endangered and Critically Endangered) are defined in terms of the probability or risk of collapse. A paper by Bland et al. suggests four aspects for defining ecosystem collapse in risk assessments: 
 qualitatively defining initial and collapsed states 
 describing collapse and recovery transitions 
 identifying and selecting indicators of collapse 
 setting quantitative collapse thresholds.

Early detection and monitoring 

The measurement of "critical slowing down" (CSD) is one approach for developing early warning signals for a potential or likely onset of approaching collapse. It refers to increasingly slow recovery from perturbations. In one application of this indicator, a study found that more than three-quarters of the Amazon rainforest has been losing resilience due to deforestation and climate change since the early 2000s as measured by recovery-time from short-term perturbations (the critical slowing down), reinforcing the theory that it is approaching a critical transition. Another study found that that tropical, arid and temperate forests are substantially losing resilience.

Conservation and reversal 

As of now there is still not much information on effective conservation or reversal methods for ecosystem collapse. Rather, there has been increased focus on the predictability of ecosystem collapse, whether it is possible, and whether it is productive to explore. This is likely because thorough studies of at-risk ecosystems are a more recent development and trend in ecological fields, so collapse dynamics are either too recent to observe or still emerging. Since studies are not yet long term, conclusions about reversibility or transformation potential are often hard to draw from newer, more focused, studies.

See also  
 Ecological collapse
 Tipping points in the climate system

References 

Ecosystems
IUCN Red List of Ecosystems